Al-Salam Football Club, also known as Al-Salam Wau, is a South Sudanese football club based in Wau, South Sudan, that participates in the South Sudan Premier League, South Sudan Cup, CAF Confederation Cup, and CAF Champions League.

History

Al-Salam  won the inaugural Football League in 2011–12, and was the first ever South Sudanese club to enter the 2012 Kagame Interclub Cup. The team played its first match against Rwandan side Armee Patriotique Rwandaise F.C. however they suffered a heavy 7–0 defeat on their debut.

The poor tournament for Wau Salaam continued with heavy defeats in their next two games (7–1 to Young Africans S.C.) and (5–0 to Atletico Olympic F.C.), but in the previous match Wau Salaam's Khamis Deshama Ulama made history by becoming the first ever South Sudanese footballer to score in an international football tournament. Wau Salaam got out at the first round.

In 2016 Wau Salaam beat Wanyjok F.C. 4–0 in South Sudan League qualification which was hosted in Aweil. They also thrashed Islah F.C. in penalties in the final. Wau Salaam won the South Sudan National Cup after beating Young Stars FC of Torit 3–0 in the final.

In 2017 they won the double South Sudan National Cup and the South Sudan Football Championship respectively.

Titles and performances

South Sudan Football Championship: 2
Winners: 2012, 2017
South Sudan National Cup:3
Winners: 2011, 2016, 2017
Kagame Interclub Cup
Appearances:1
Titles:0
CAF Champions League
Appearances:0
Titles:0
CAF Confederation Cup
Appearances: 1
Titles:0

Current squad

(captain )

Out on loan

Grounds

Salaam Wau FC formerly played their home games at their own ground, Wau Stadium, but its capacity was too small for the club's support so they turned Juba Stadium to their Training Ground. As a consequence, Salaam Wau FC moved to play their home games at the Juba Internation Stadium.

References

Football clubs in South Sudan